Toby Mills is a fictional character from the British Channel 4 soap opera Hollyoaks, who arrived on 14 November 2001 played by Henry Luxemburg until 24 October 2003.
Henry Luxembourg went on to be an icon of St Anselms college where he currently teaches English.

Storylines
Toby first appears as the friend of Dan Hunter (Andrew McNair). The pair are arrested when they have a fight outside The Dog in the Pond public house with Adam Morgan (David Brown) and Jamie Nash (Stefan Booth). Toby moves to the village to help the Hunter family search for Ellie Hunter (Sarah Baxendale), when she went missing in Ibiza. He begins working at The Dog with Izzy Cornwell (Elize du Toit) and begins living there. Toby is shocked when Ellie returns to the village. Ellie warns Toby that when they had sex she may have given him gonorrhoea. Ellie tells her brother, Dan, and her father Les (John Graham Davies), who attack Toby. Toby keeps his distance from Ellie. He begins dating Mandy Richardson (Sarah Jayne Dunn), but the relationship ends when Toby claims that Mandy is too possessive. Toby leaves college and begins to work part-time at The Loft. However, Ellie is the manager at The Loft, which resulted in some tension between her and Toby. Dan advised Toby to not let her get to him, but with Ellie flirting with The Loft's boss Scott Anderson (Daniel Hyde), Toby could not help feeling jealous.
Toby Mills Gavin Ellis on EastEnders the Queen Vic in Albert Square Mills family 
Toby soon discovered that Ellie's parents had thrown her out and he offered her a place to stay at The Dog. The pair began dating again, but Toby still disliked Ellie working for Scott. Soon Scott sacked her and Toby also quit his job at the Loft. Toby’s mum Linda arrived, and she caused a stir in his relationship with Ellie. Ellie put Toby under pressure to choose between her or his mother. Toby made a difficult decision, and decided it was Ellie he wanted to be with and he told his mother that he'd had enough of her interfering. Toby was then worried when Ellie decided to go on a reality TV program called the Fish Tank. Toby made her promise not to flirt with any men there. During Ellie's experience of The Fish Tank, rumours started to spread around the village that Ellie had slept with someone. Toby became angry by Ellie's actions and was frustrated that Ellie had not kept her promise. Toby demanded Chloe Bruce (Mikyla Dodd) allow Ellie to get out of the Fish Tank, otherwise his relationship was over with her. Ellie was allowed out for an hour, and Toby told her that he was getting impatient and angry by Ellie's lies. Ellie got upset about how little Toby thought of her, and told him that she slept with everyone.

Toby then murdered a blonde named Roxy at the River Dee. Toby was unwilling to take any responsibility for his actions. After the murder he went home and looked into a mirror and, seemingly, argued with himself, blaming someone else for his actions and telling himself that he is good. Over the next few days Toby felt guilty and especially when Ellie returned and convinced him to give their relationship one last try. A week later, Dan told Toby that he had slept with Roxy, and the police had found her body. The blame of Roxy's death went to Toby's best friend Dan after he slept with her, hours before she was murdered. Toby's best friend and Ellie's brother Dan had been arrested, but with the help of Toby’s guilt, Toby provided Dan with a good solicitor as Dan had been soon released. There was not much evidence against Dan and he was released. When Toby's mother returns she tries to convince him that Ellie is cheating on him. In anger, he struck again this time on teenager Steph Dean (Carley Stenson) leaving her there for dead but the crime was witnessed and he was followed by his mother Linda. After a confrontation with his mother, Toby lashed out pushing her down the stairs. This had left Toby astonished of what he'd done, and when Ellie arrived the pair managed to make the incident look more like an accident. When the police arrived they told Toby that Linda was dead and further bad news for Toby was that Steph was alive but suffering with memory loss. Toby was left scared of the truth being discovered and feeling guilty after Steph had developed epilepsy post-attack, a condition which she would battle for the rest of her life. He then killed around 11 more blonde girls between July 2002 and October 2003. In order for Toby to stop killing these girls, he needed Ellie to be more committed to him and decided to marry her. Ellie was delighted as the pair got married in a low profile wedding without inviting Ellie’s parents. Steph continues to make progress and begins regaining her memory. Toby confesses to Ellie leaving her frightened and afraid of his next move. Toby was also scared that Ellie would tell the police or her family and stopped her from leaving his flat.

In the late-night special Hollyoaks: Leap of Faith, Ellie could no longer cope with Toby and ran off to Liverpool, with Toby close in her wake. Ellie confronted him and Toby promised that he would hand himself in, but he just wanted to enjoy his last few hours with her. After the hours went by, Toby caught Ellie trying to get in contact with her brother which made Toby furious. Toby decided to bet with Ellie whether their love could survive anything, and suggested they each jump onto the opposite roof building. Ellie, however, was concerned as Toby continued to get increasingly aggressive. Dan arrived in time to witness Toby harming Ellie. In order to save his sister's life, Dan pushed Toby off the building, where he landed in the road and was hit by a car. This was witnessed by several people, including Ellie and Dan's sister Lisa, who had come with Dan to rescue Ellie. Toby later dies.

The Hunter family blamed him for ruining Ellie's life that caused her to turn against them. After her brother Dan's death, Ellie visits Toby's grave and angrily tells him that she wishes she had not married him as it destroyed her relationship with her family.

References

Hollyoaks characters
Fictional criminals in soap operas
Fictional serial killers
Fictional stalkers
Male characters in television
Television characters introduced in 2001
Male villains